The 36 Crazy Fists is a 1977 Hong Kong action martial arts film directed by Charlie Chen Chi-Hwa. Jackie Chan was the stunt coordinator and action director.

External links 
 

1977 films
Hong Kong martial arts films
Kung fu films
1970s Hong Kong films